Gary Wayne MacDonald (born December 15, 1953) is a freestyle swimmer from Canada, who won a silver medal in the men's 4×100-metre medley relay at the 1976 Summer Olympics in Montreal.  He did so alongside Graham Smith, Clay Evans, and Stephen Pickell.  Gary was the Canadian record holder in the 50-metre freestyle as well.  He also won two silver medals in relay events at the 1975 Pan American Games.

MacDonald lives in Halifax, Nova Scotia.  He was the head coach of the Halifax Trojan Aquatic Club until his retirement in 2004; a position he had held for twenty two years. He was an assistant coach with the Dalhousie University Tigers varsity swim club for 11 years. In September 2015, he became the Acadia University head coach for the Axemen and Axewomen varsity swim team.

The Gary MacDonald Park was recently opened in Mission, named after him.

See also
 List of Commonwealth Games medallists in swimming (men)
 List of Olympic medalists in swimming (men)

References

1953 births
Living people
People from Mission, British Columbia
Canadian male freestyle swimmers
Canadian swimming coaches
Olympic silver medalists for Canada
Olympic swimmers of Canada
Sportspeople from British Columbia
Swimmers at the 1974 British Commonwealth Games
Swimmers at the 1975 Pan American Games
Swimmers at the 1976 Summer Olympics
Swimmers at the 1978 Commonwealth Games
Medalists at the 1976 Summer Olympics
Pan American Games silver medalists for Canada
Olympic silver medalists in swimming
Commonwealth Games medallists in swimming
Commonwealth Games gold medallists for Canada
Commonwealth Games bronze medallists for Canada
Pan American Games medalists in swimming
Medalists at the 1975 Pan American Games
Medallists at the 1974 British Commonwealth Games
Medallists at the 1978 Commonwealth Games